Greg West (born 25 July 1994) is an Australian professional cricketer who currently represents New South Wales and the Sydney Sixers. He made his Twenty20 (T20) debut for Adelaide Strikers in the 2015–16 Big Bash League season on 13 January 2016. He made his first-class debut for New South Wales in the 2018–19 Sheffield Shield season on 7 December 2018.

References

External links
 

1994 births
Living people
Australian cricketers
Adelaide Strikers cricketers
New South Wales cricketers
Sydney Sixers cricketers